The Site A/Plot M Disposal Site is located within Red Gate Woods and situated on the former grounds of Argonne National Laboratory and its predecessor, the University of Chicago Metallurgical Laboratory in Cook County, Illinois and is part of the Palos Forest Preserve.  The site contains buried radioactive waste from contaminated building debris, and the Chicago Pile-1 (CP-1/CP-2), and Chicago Pile-3 (CP-3) nuclear reactors.  "Site A" was an early Manhattan Project code for the facility.  "Plot M" was the code name used for the disposal ground.

Site history
During a horseback ride in early 1942, the head of the Metallurgical Project, Professor Arthur Compton, identified a plot of land in what was then known as the Argonne Forest, as the location for part of the Manhattan Project.  Shortly after the December 1942 demonstration of the first self-sustaining chain reaction at the University of Chicago, the research group led by Enrico Fermi needed to move to the larger, more remote laboratory campus.  The U.S. Army Corps of Engineers had leased  from the Forest Preserve District of Cook County, and placed the wartime reactor laboratory on  within the forest.  The first reactor, CP-1, was disassembled and moved to Site A in March 1943, renamed as Chicago Pile 2.  In May 1944 the laboratory first operated a second, heavy water-moderated reactor, CP-3 on the site.  Argonne National Laboratory obtained an even larger, permanent site in Du Page County in 1947 and began moving its operations out of Site A to the new site.  The two reactors operated until 1954, conducting reactor research and production of tritium.  Decontamination and demolition of the buildings began in 1955.  The reactors were defueled and the concrete shell for CP-3 was imploded and buried.  In 1956 the property was returned to the forest preserve.  Two granite monuments mark Site A and Plot M.

The Site A marker reads:
THE WORLD'S FIRST NUCLEAR REACTOR
WAS REBUILT AT THIS SITE IN 1943 AFTER INITIAL OPERATION AT THE UNIVERSITY OF CHICAGO THIS REACTOR (CP-2) AND THE FIRST HEAVY WATER MODERATED REACTOR (CP-3) WERE MAJOR FACILITIES AROUND WHICH DEVELOPED THE ARGONNE NATIONAL LABORATORY THIS SITE WAS RELEASED BY THE LABORATORY IN 1956 AND THE U.S. ATOMIC ENERGY COMMISSION THEN BURIED THE REACTORS HERE.
The Plot M marker reads:
CAUTION—DO NOT DIG
Buried in this area is radioactive 
material from nuclear research 
conducted here 1943–1949. Burial
area is marked by six corner markers 
100ft from this center point.  
There is no danger to visitors.
U.S. Department of Energy 1978
The markers have since been vandalized, with vandals chiseling off the word "NO"  from the sentence "There is no danger to visitors".

Plot M was a dump for low-level radioactive waste generated at the site between 1943 and 1949.  Initially buried in trenches, later in steel bins, the waste included tritium, uranium, and fission products in various forms including contaminated equipment, animal carcases, and solids.  In 1949 the burial of waste at the site was halted, and the dump was covered with grass until 1956, when a concrete cover was installed to protect the landfill from rainwater.

In April 1998 the fence separating Site A from the rest of Red Gate Woods was taken down after a DOE determination that the risk to the public while enjoying the forest preserve is minimal.

Location 
Site A is located near . Plot M is located near .

See also 
Sag Bridge, Illinois

References

External links 
Forest Preserves of Cook County Red Gate Woods: ‘Site A’
Office of Legacy Management's Site A/Plot M page

Radioactive waste repositories in the United States
Manhattan Project sites
Argonne National Laboratory
Geography of Cook County, Illinois